The Kuravar is an ethnic Tamil community native to the Kurinji mountain region of TamilNadu and Kerala, India. , the Kuravars have been unable to attain status as a scheduled tribe.

People of this community are called with different names in different parts of South India. They are called as Yerukula in Andhra Pradesh (derived from the tradition of fortune telling by the women), Korama, Korachas in Karnataka, Kaikadi in Maharashtra, and Sidanar in Kerala. Today there are an estimated 1.2 million (12 lakh) Kuravar in Tamil Nadu and Kerala.

Colonial era 
During British rule in India they were placed under Criminal Tribes Act 1871, hence stigmatized for a long time, after Independence however they were denotified in 1952, though the stigma continues.

The 1906 publication the Travancore State Manual, of the princely state of Travancore, contains an entry describing the Kuravar:The Kuravars, a race bearing resemblance to the Vedars or hill-men, form a pretty large community in Travancore, numbering 53,584 according to the last Census. The names of some places and tradition show that they must have been holding sway over some small territories on this coast. They are divided into several groups some of which are the Kunta Kurava, the Pandi Kurava, and the Kakka Kurava. Like the Pulayas they form the chief field labourers in the taluqs in which they live. They are found in the greatest number in Kunnattur, Chirayinkil, and Kottarakara. The Kunta Kurava, the most important sect among the class, resemble the Nayars in several respects. They are divided into Illam, Swarupam, &c, and follow the Marumakkathayam system of inheritance. They also celebrate the Kettu Kalyanam and Sambandham and observe sixteen days' death-pollution like the Nayars. They bury their dead and are considered extremely low in the social scale. Primary education has not made any progress among them. Barely four in a thousand can read and write.

References

Indian castes
Ethnic groups in India
Social groups of Tamil Nadu
Social groups of Kerala